Poey may refer to:
 Felipe Poey
 Oscar Poey Bonachea